The 1968 Victorian Football Association season was the 87th season of the top division of the Australian rules football competition, and the eighth season of second division competition. The Division 1 premiership was won by the Preston Football Club, after it defeated Prahran in the Grand Final on 22 September by 14 points; it was Preston's first Division 1 premiership. The Division 2 premiership was won by Geelong West.

Division 1
The Division 1 home-and-home season was played over 18 rounds; the top four then contested the finals under the Page–McIntyre system. The finals were held at the Punt Road Oval, in Richmond.

Ladder

Finals

Awards
The leading goalkicker for the season was Jim Miller (Dandenong), who kicked 72 goals in the home-and-away season and 77 overall.
The J. J. Liston Trophy was won by Dick Telford (Preston), who polled 31 votes. Telford finished ahead of Norm Luff (Oakleigh), who finished second with 26 votes; Brian Vaughan and John Ward (both of Sandringham) were equal third with 21 votes.
Port Melbourne won the seconds premiership. Port Melbourne 16.14 (110) defeated Sandringham 10.17 (77) in the Grand Final, played as a stand-alone match on Saturday 21 September at Skinner Reserve.

Division 2
The Division 2 home-and-home season was played over seventeen rounds; the top four then contested the finals under the Page–McIntyre system.

Ladder

Finals

Awards
The leading goalkicker for Division 2 was Eddie Szyszka (Williamstown), who kicked 57 goals in the home-and-away season, and 61 goals overall.
The Division 2 Best and Fairest was won by Ian Nankervis (Williamstown), who polled 30 votes. Geoff Bryant (Box Hill) finished in second place with 28 votes; David Harris (Geelong West) was third with 23 votes.
Northcote won the seconds premiership. Northcote 17.11 (113) defeated Sunshine 10.15 (75) in the Grand Final, held as a stand-alone match on Saturday 31 August at Skinner Reserve.

Notable events

Interstate matches
The Association contested two interstate matches during 1968. Keith Burns (Brunswick) captained the team against Canberra, and Max Papley (Williamstown) captained the team against Tasmania.

As a consequence of the Association's expulsion from the ANFC in 1969/70, these were the last representative matches played by the Association until 1975.

Other notable events
Following his win in the Division 2 Best and Fairest award, Ian Nankervis immediately sought a pay rise from the Williamstown Football Club; the request which was rejected, and the club omitted him from the Grand Final team for his disloyalty. Williamstown lost the Grand Final by twelve points, and has since been left to speculate whether dropping its best player cost it the flag. He moved to Dandenong Football Club in 1969.

External links
List of VFA/VFL premiers

References

Victorian Football League seasons
VFL